Scott Brockenshire (born 1 March 1969) is an Australian Paralympic swimmer, who has won six medals at the 1996 Atlanta and 2000 Sydney Paralympics.

Biography
Brockenshire was born in the Melbourne suburb of Prahran and lives in the Northern Rivers of New South Wales. He was born without a tibia and a shortened femur on his left leg, and at the age of eighteen months, his left foot was amputated. He began swimming at the age of about ten to improve his fitness. He won medals in able-bodied surf lifesaving competitions and was the state surf ski champion in 1987. He was inspired to take up competitive swimming after watching the events for people with disabilities at the 1994 Victoria Commonwealth Games in Canada.

At the 1996 Atlanta Paralympics, he won a silver medal in the Men's 4x100 m Freestyle S7–10 event and two bronze medals in the Men's 100 m Butterfly S10 and Men's 50 m Freestyle S10 events. In the final for the men's 4x100 m freestyle event, he was responsible for narrowing the British lead and keeping his relay team competitive. At the 2000 Sydney Paralympics, he won a silver medal in the Men's 4x100 m Freestyle 34 pts event and two bronze medals in the Men's 100 m Butterfly S10 and Men's 100 m Freestyle S10 events.

Brockenshire inspired New Zealand Paralympian Steven Yates to take up disabled sport.

He worked in Ballina, New South Wales as the manager of a gym.

References

Male Paralympic swimmers of Australia
Swimmers at the 1996 Summer Paralympics
Swimmers at the 2000 Summer Paralympics
Medalists at the 1996 Summer Paralympics
Medalists at the 2000 Summer Paralympics
Paralympic silver medalists for Australia
Paralympic bronze medalists for Australia
Paralympic medalists in swimming
Australian male freestyle swimmers
Australian male butterfly swimmers
S10-classified Paralympic swimmers
Amputee category Paralympic competitors
Australian amputees
Sportsmen from Victoria (Australia)
Sportsmen from New South Wales
People from Prahran, Victoria
Swimmers from Melbourne
1969 births
Living people